Eklenhui (Iyojwaja Chorote) is a language spoken in northeast Salta in Argentina by about 800 people. It is also known as Choroti, Yofuaha, and Eklenjuy.

It is distinct from the similarly named Iyowujwa Chorote.

References

Languages of Argentina
Languages of Chile
Matacoan languages
Chaco linguistic area